Amerigo Vespucci's Letter from Seville (18 July 1500), written to his patron Lorenzo di Pierfrancesco de' Medici, describes experiences on Alonso de Ojeda's May 1499 voyage. Vespucci's findings during the Age of Discovery led Spain people to believe that North and South America were not connected to Asia, which was a common belief at the time and was even held by Vespucci himself. Despite the surrounding controversy among many historians about which Vespucci letters were real, and which ones were forged, this particular letter of Vespucci's is notable for its detailed description of the Brazilian coast and its inhabitants.

Authenticity of the Letter 
Antonello Gerbi argues that the 1500 "Letter from Seville", the 4 July 1501 "Letter from Cape Verdi," and the 1502 "Letter from Lisbon," all written to Lorenzo di Pierfrancesco de' Medici, are the only three authentic Vespucci letters.

In 1497, Vespucci sailed with Spain and left Cadiz, Spain on his first journey where he was sailing through the West Indies. In the "Letter from Seville", he wrote that "we sailed for about thirteen hundred leagues to that land from the city of Cadiz"  However, the voyage in 1497 was to reach the West Indies instead of Brazil. Vespucci in the letter also wrote "we...discovered a very large country of Asia"

Synopsis 
Amerigo Vespucci, a European explorer, sailed for Spain in an effort to explore Asia. By sailing southwest from the Atlantic Ocean, Vespucci and his crew ended up discovering South America, which he initially thought was connected to Asia. Vespucci wrote the “Letter from Seville” in Seville, Spain after finishing his voyage in order to summarize all his discoveries in South America. Vespucci was satisfied with the voyage because he crossed the equator successfully and explored the tropics, which were called the Torrid Zone at that time, and investigated rivers and different plant and animal species.

	While Vespucci sailed south in the Atlantic Ocean, he and his crew became lost because of a miscalculation of only a few degrees. It was difficult for them to find the directions in the ocean by sunlight, as the equator had days and nights of equal length. By comparing drawings and the actual locations, they fixed errors on the map. After sailing through the equator, Vespucci was able to disprove the contemporary philosophy that claimed the tropics were inhospitable to life because of the heat. Vespucci learned that the Torrid Zone was more densely populated than the surrounding areas. 
	Vespucci had arrived in Brazil by sailing into the Amazon and Pará rivers, which were connected to the Atlantic Ocean. When Vespucci and his crew sailed into the river, they had a hard time to find a place to dock because they were surrounded by swamps. They encountered various flora and fauna that amazed them. This huge ecosystem made Vespucci call Brazil a “terrestrial paradise.”  
	The voyage for Vespucci and his crew was also full of interactions with the indigenous people. When they arrived at some locations, they got off the boat with weapons. Vespucci discovered that the indigenous people were naked without shame and stated that they were of  “a different nature.”  Across all the places Vespucci and his crew explored, they observed that the indigenous people were cannibals. In his letter, Vespucci showed respect by mentioning the fact that the indigenous people only ate enemies and slaves, and never ate women. Some indigenous tribes reacted to the presence of explorers differently than others. Some tribes showed affection by providing food and giving gifts, whereas others were more fearful and hostile. In some situations, the explorers chose to fight and kill the indigenous people and burn down their villages. Vespucci and his crew also gained some new items from trade. However, they could not collect huge numbers of the goods because they were on a long voyage and only stopped temporarily. Vespucci and his crew mainly collected brazilwood for dye and cotton. Besides the encounters with the indigenous people, Vespucci discovered that each tribe they met spoke a different language. This experience had expanded Vespucci's horizon on his perception of language diversity, which he initially thought that “in the world there [were] not more than seventy-seven languages.”

Reception 

Many authors have criticized Letter from Seville as being falsified information, accusing Vespucci of never truly making the voyage to Brazil or over exaggerating his role. Thomas More describes Europe in Utopia: A Revised Translation, Backgrounds, Criticism as fundamentally corrupt, creating a culture in which Vespucci would feel encouraged to recreate experiences heard from others.

Other's place blame on mapmakers and interpreters of Vespucci's time. Felipe Fernández-Armesto describes Vespucci as a common Italian sailor, whose writings were misinterpreted by contemporaries. Fernández-Armesto firmly establishes that only two of the four voyages were factual, of which Vespucci did not command. Fault is moved past him, and unto those who circulated his writings.

Alternatively, Charles Whitney criticizes modern historians for being unable to distinguish between Christopher Columbus and Vespucci, attempting to credit both with discovering the Americas and creating mass misinformation. He argues misconceptions lie within academia, preventing a true understanding of Vespucci's accounts.

Background

Age of Exploration 
The letter and the exploration it represents is part of the era known as The Age of Exploration or The Age of Discovery. It began in the 15th century and continued into the 17th century and is classified as a time when Europe expanded its knowledge of geography for trade routes and riches. It chronologically overlaps with the Renaissance and shares some of the same values such as a search for provable knowledge. The maritime explorations were often the first contact between many cultures and Europeans. Spain and Portugal later followed by France, Great Britain, and the Netherlands often funded the voyages in hopes of enriching themselves and sometimes for scientific discovery. One impetus for the curiosity of naval exploration began when the Ottoman Empire blocked traditional trade routes such as Constantinople, North Africa, and the Red Sea. Henry the Navigator, a prince of Portugal, began funding voyages for economic benefit and in hopes of a Christian expansion that would contain the spread and growing power of Islam. Notable explorers were Christopher Columbus, Bartolomeu Dias, Vasco da Gama, John Cabot, Pedro Álvares Cabral, Ferdinand Magellan, Jacques Cartier, and later Henry Hudson, Hernán Cortés, and Francisco Pizarro. The voyages were possible through certain technological advancements such as astrolabes, magnetic compasses, and triangular sails as well as more reliable maps and mapping systems. Many of the technological knowledge of these advancements were developed elsewhere and borrowed by European crews. The technologies improved and the grasp of geography grew with further explorations. Ming China was also expanding its naval knowledge during the 1400s, but in 1436 the emperor outlawed more voyages after reaching East Africa. The Age of Exploration challenged existing world views, improved geographic and naval knowledge, and created a global power structure that altered countless communities and cultures. Contact, as Vespucci's letter outlines, was not always a peaceful encounter. Beyond the often violent clashes of the sailor and native peoples upon arrival, the Age of Exploration gave rise to an even more violent system of colonization with disease, forced restructuring of societies, mass displacement of people from the Transatlantic slave trade, and other drastic changes that created an imbalance of power that last for centuries after the Age of Discovery.

Author 
Amerigo Vespucci (1451-1512) was an Italian sailor and accomplished navigator who made multiple voyages to the Americas under either Portuguese or Spanish funding. He eventually became a Spanish citizen. He developed a relationship with the Medici family through going to France to represent the family before the French king in 1479. His voyages were in last decade of the 15th century and first decade of the 16th century. In 1505 his career on ships ended because he began work in Spain as a consultant. His name was immortalized by German cartographer, Martin Waldseemüller, in 1507 who used the word "America" on a map of the new continent. In 1508, he became the chief navigator overseeing voyages and compiling data into maps for Spain. He continued with this well respected job later on until his death. Vespucci contributed to the Age of Exploration both as an explorer and Spanish official.

The voyages of Vespucci 
The voyage of 1499 was sponsored by Spain. This voyage was considered the second voyage for centuries until the 20th century when controversy arose because some historians began to believe many of the documents were forgeries, including the documents about what had been believed to be his first voyage. Due to this dispute in the records, it is unknown how many voyages he undertook. Historians are confident the voyage of 1499 took place while the reports of a previous journey are dubious. On this journey with four ships, Vespucci traveled to present day Guyana, then south to the mouth of the Amazon River and continuing south, possibly as far as Cape St. Augustine, before turning back. On the journey home, he visited Trinidad and Hispaniola. His other verified voyage of 1501 was sponsored by Portugal. This voyage led Vespucci to the realization that he had not reached Asia, but instead a "New World." He potentially undertook another voyage in 1504.

References

Further reading 
 Fernández-Armesto, Felipe (2007) Amerigo: The Man Who Gave his Name to America. New York: Random House.

External links 
 Full text English translation of the letter by Frederick J. Pohl

Historiography of Brazil
Spanish exploration in the Age of Discovery
16th-century documents
1500 works